McGill Arctic Research Station (Expedition Fiord) (MARS) is a small research station operated by McGill University located near the centre of Axel Heiberg Island, Nunavut. It was first established in 1959 after scientists explored South Fiord (Expedition Fiord). The station contains a small hut, a cook house and two temporary structures. It can support 8-12 people and gives them access to the research activities. The current activities are glaciology, climate change, permafrost, hydrology, geology, geomorphology, limnology, planetary analogues, and microbiology. Today, the station is only used in the summer months so there would be enough power generated from the solar panels.

The director of the research station is Wayne Pollard (from McGill University). He has many experiences with drilling and geophysical tools. His goals are to identify niche environments in permafrost capable of harbouring microbial life at or near the limit of its habitability.

Geography
McGill Arctic Research Station is located near the terminus of three glaciers: Baby Glacier, White Glacier and Thompson Glacier. It is also beside the Expedition River and Colour Lake. The glaciers have been monitored from 1960 to 1999 with gaps in between them. The area surrounding it are rolling hills and tall mountains.

Climate
Because of the cold temperatures, they can test how microbes can survive on the other colder planets in our Solar System. The station receives polar night from the first week of November until the beginning of February, and the midnight sun from the beginning of April until the second week of September.

See also

 Baffin, Unorganized - the census area to which McGill Arctic Research Station belongs
List of research stations in the Arctic

Notes

External links
 Official site
 Canada's North may hold clues to water (and life!) on Mars
 Ice Related Data Series from Expedition Fiord
 Monthly Archives: August 2010 MARS

Research stations in the Arctic
Research in Canada
Populated places in Arctic Canada
Populated places in the Qikiqtaaluk Region
1959 establishments in Canada